Cedar Grove is an unincorporated community in Henderson County, Tennessee, United States.

References

Unincorporated communities in Henderson County, Tennessee
Unincorporated communities in Tennessee